Cedar Mesa is a plateau in San Juan County in the southeastern portion of the U.S. state of Utah. The surrounding terrain has a typical elevation of just  Most of Cedar Mesa is included in the newly declared (2016) Bears Ears National Monument.

This large difference in elevation has led to the formation of numerous canyons, cliffs, and other erosional features on the edges of the mesa.  To the east are several canyons draining into Comb Wash, including Arch, Texas, Mule, Owl, Fish, McCloyd, and Road Canyons.  Scattered throughout these canyons are cliff dwellings of the Ancient Puebloans.

To the southeast is an eroded area called the Valley of the Gods, and to the southwest is a deep gorge of the San Juan River, called the Goosenecks.  High above, on the southern edge of Cedar Mesa, are Muley and Cedar Points.

The west side of Cedar Mesa also includes large canyons, including John's and Slickhorn Canyons, and the combination of Grand Gulch and Bullet Canyon known as the Grand Gulch Primitive Area.  To the northwest is the Natural Bridges National Monument and Stimper Arch.

State Route 95 crosses the northern part of Cedar Mesa, while U.S. Route 163 passes to the south.  Running up the center of the mesa is State Route 261.  Gravel and dirt roads provide access in dry weather to the individual canyons, through the Valley of the Gods, and to Comb Wash.

Archaeology

As early as 13,000 years ago Clovis people, who are considered to be the ancestors of most of the indigenous cultures of the Americas, hunted in Cedar Mesa using "Clovis points". One of the oldest known archaeological sites with Clovis tools in Utah is Lime Ridge Clovis Site.

See also
Cedar Mesa Sandstone, named for outcrops on Cedar Mesa

References

External links

 The Cedar Mesa Project
 Friends of Cedar Mesa
 Cedar Mesa Hiking & Canyoneering Routes

Mesas of Utah
Rock formations of Utah
Landforms of San Juan County, Utah
Colorado Plateau
Bears Ears National Monument